The 1998 Espirito Santo Trophy took place 12–15 November at Prince of Wales Country Club in Santiago, Chile.

It was the 18th women's golf World Amateur Team Championship for the Espirito Santo Trophy.

The tournament was a 72-hole stroke play team event. There were 33 team entries, each with three players. The best two scores for each round counted towards the team total.

The United States team won the Trophy for their 13th title, beating team Italy and team Germany by 21 strokes, the widest margin of victory in the history of the championship. Italy and Germany shared the silver medal on second place.

The individual title went to Jenny Chuasiriporn, United States, whose score of 12-under-par, 276, was seven strokes ahead of her teammate Kellee Booth.

Teams 
33 teams entered the event and completed the competition. Each team had three players.

Results 

Sources:

Individual leaders 
There was no official recognition for the lowest individual scores.

References

External links 
World Amateur Team Championships on International Golf Federation website

Espirito Santo Trophy
Golf tournaments in Chile
Espirito Santo Trophy
Espirito Santo Trophy
Espirito Santo Trophy